A hundred-year wave is a statistically projected water wave, the height of which, on average, is met or exceeded once in a hundred years for a given location. The likelihood of this wave height being attained at least once in the hundred-year period is 63%. As a projection of the most extreme wave which can be expected to occur in a given body of water, the hundred-year wave is a factor commonly taken into consideration by designers of oil platforms and other offshore structures. Periods of time other than a hundred years may also be taken into account, resulting in, for instance, a fifty-year wave.

Various methods are employed to predict the possible steepness and period of these waves, in addition to their height.

See also
Index of wave articles
Significant wave height
Shallow water equations
Rogue wave

References

Physical oceanography
Water waves